"Sure" was the fifteenth single by the Japanese J-pop group Every Little Thing, released on February 16, 2000. It was used as theme song of the drama Virtual Girl.

Track listing
 Sure (Words - Kaori Mochida / music - Every Little Thing)
 Switch (Words - Kaori Mochida / music - Ichiro Ito)
 Sure (instrumental)
 Switch (instrumental)

Chart positions

External links
 Sure information at Avex Network.
 Sure information at Oricon.

2000 singles
Every Little Thing (band) songs
Songs written by Kaori Mochida
Japanese television drama theme songs
2000 songs
Avex Trax singles